Dysfunctional Family Picnic was a multi-artist alternative rock concert, presented annually by the New York City, New York, US radio station K-Rock, beginning in 1997. Its West Coast "sister" concert is the KROQ Weenie Roast.

History
There have been various venues that hosted the Dysfunctional Family Picnic including Forest Hills Tennis Stadium in Queens, New York, PNC Bank Arts Center in Holmdel, New Jersey, Giants Stadium, in East Rutherford, New Jersey, and Jones Beach Amphitheatre in Wantagh, New York.

In 2003, the Dysfunctional Family Picnic was called "DFP 7-Tarium". Instead of booking an original show, it was just another stop on Metallica's Summer Sanitarium tour.

After K-Rock returned to the air in 2007, "Return of Rock" was their first concert.

Lineups
Bands listed in reverse order of night's performance (or alphabetical order if not known).

Rock festivals in the United States
Festivals in New York City
Festivals established in 1997
1997 establishments in New York City